The Canon TX is a 35mm single-lens reflex camera that was manufactured and sold by Canon of Japan from March 1975.  It features a Canon FD lens mount, and is also compatible with Canon's earlier FL-mount lenses in stop-down metering mode.  The TX was a cheaper version of the Canon FTb for the export market, as was the slightly earlier TLb.  Compared to the TLb, the TX has a hot shoe for flash.

Compared to the FTb, the TX has a top shutter speed of only 1/500. The meter is center-weighted rather than the 12% partial meter of the FTb. It also dispenses with the self-timer and MLU of the FTb, although it does retain the depth of field preview lever and support for stopped-down metering. The TX also does not support the CAT (Canon Auto-Tuning) flash system.

It was also sold in the US as the Bell & Howell FD35.

References

FZ TX